Reichenbachiella is a chemoorganotrophic and strictly aerobic genus from the family of Flammeovirgaceae. this bacteria genus is named after the German microbiologist Hans Reichenbach.

References

Further reading 
 

Cytophagia
Bacteria genera